The shortjaw kōkopu (Galaxias postvectis) is a galaxiid fish, endemic to New Zealand. They are large, scaleless fish which inhabit stable pools in cascading, bouldery streams with forest cover. Shortjaw kōkopu are amphidromous, with the fry going to sea after hatching, and returning as juveniles to fresh water where they grow to adulthood.

The shortjaw kōkopu live in microhabitats that have more large particles at the bed of the body of water (substrates) and more places to seek safety compared to all nearby possible habitats. During the night, they remain in calmer areas like pools, whereas during the day shortjaw kōkopu spend their time in places with large substrates and a more tumultuous water surface, staying in both flow channel and pool habits.

References

 
 NIWA Fish Atlas - Shortjaw Kokopu June 2006

External links 
 New Zealand native freshwater galaxiid fish, Shortjaw kokopu TerraNature, Auckland 2010

Galaxias
Endemic freshwater fish of New Zealand
Fish described in 1899